Blunts is a hamlet southeast of Quethiock in the civil parish of Quethiock in east Cornwall, England, United Kingdom. It is situated west of the River Lynher valley about 5 miles (8 km) north-west of Saltash on the road from Quethiock village to Landrake. The meaning of Blunts is "Blunt family's workshop". The hamlet has a Methodist chapel (formerly Bible Christian), a garage, and a women's institute.

References

Hamlets in Cornwall